Hendricks Township is a township in Chautauqua County, Kansas, USA.  As of the 2000 census, its population was 179.

Geography
According to the USGS, it contains four cemeteries: De Busk, Elgin, Moore Prairie and Wilson.

The streams of Buzzard Creek, Grant Creek, Little Cedar Creek, Sycamore Creek and West Cedar Creek run through this township.

References
 USGS Geographic Names Information System (GNIS)

External links
 US-Counties.com
 City-Data.com

Townships in Chautauqua County, Kansas
Townships in Kansas